

Notable alumni

Nobel laureates

Julius Axelrod 1933 – Nobel laureate in Medicine, 1970
Kenneth Arrow 1940 – Nobel laureate in Economics, 1972
Herbert Hauptman 1937 – Nobel laureate in Chemistry, 1985
Robert Hofstadter 1935 – Nobel laureate in Physics, 1961
Jerome Karle 1937 – Nobel laureate in Chemistry, 1985
Arthur Kornberg 1937 – Nobel laureate in Medicine, 1959
Leon M. Lederman 1943 – Nobel laureate in Physics, 1988
Arno Penzias 1954 – Nobel laureate in Physics, 1978
Robert J. Aumann 1950 – Nobel laureate in Economics, 2005
John O'Keefe, 1963 – Nobel laureate in Physiology or Medicine, 2014

Rhodes Scholars
James T. Molloy 1939

Chancellors
Matthew Goldstein – former chancellor of the City University of New York (1999-2013).

Politics, government and sociology

Herman Badillo 1951 – former Congressman and Chairman of CUNY's Board of Trustees, an architect of the University's academic rebirth
Bernard M. Baruch 1889 – Wall Street financier; adviser to American Presidents for 40 years, from Woodrow Wilson to John F. Kennedy
Abraham D. Beame 1928 – mayor of New York City, 1974 to 1977
Daniel Bell – sociologist, professor at Harvard University
Stephen Bronner – political theorist, Marxist, professor at Rutgers University
Upendra J. Chivukula – first Asian American elected to the New Jersey General Assembly
Henry Cohen 1943 – Director of Föhrenwald DP Camp; founding dean of the Milano School for Management and Urban Policy at The New School
Suzanne DiMaggio - long-time analyst of U.S. Foreign Policy in Asia and the Middle East
Benjamin B. Ferencz 1920 – international jurist 
Abraham Foxman – National Director of the Anti-Defamation League
Felix Frankfurter 1902 – justice of the U.S. Supreme Court, 1939-1962
George Friedman – founder of Stratfor, author, professor of political science, security and defense analyst
Nathan Glazer – sociologist and professor at Harvard University
Irving Howe – coined the phrase "New York Jewish Intellectual"
Robert T. Johnson 1972 – Bronx District Attorney
Henry Kissinger – Nobel Peace Prize and Secretary of State, National Security Advisor (did not graduate)
Ed Koch 1945 – mayor of New York City, 1978-1989
Irving Kristol 1940 – neoconservative pundit
Melvin J. Lasky 1938 – anti-communist; editor of Encounter 1958-1991
Milton Leitenberg 1955 - American arms control expert
Guillermo Linares 1975 – first Dominican-American New York City Council member
Colin Powell – United States Secretary of State (2001–2005); Chairman of the Joint Chiefs of Staff (1989–1993) and U.S. Army General; National Security Advisor (1987–1989)
Sal Restivo 1965 – pioneer ethnographer of science; one of the founders of the sociology of mathematics; founding member and former president of the Society for Social Studies of Science
Julius Rosenberg – infamous convicted spy during the Cold War
Robert F. Wagner Sr. – United States Senator from New York, 1927-1949
Michele Wallace 1975 – major figure in African-American studies, feminist studies and cultural studies
Stephen Samuel Wise 1891 – Reform rabbi, early Zionist and social justice activist
Marilyn Zayas 1965 - Judge, Ohio's First District Court of Appeals

The arts

Maurice Ashley 1993 – first African-American International Chess Grandmaster
Paddy Chayefsky – playwright and screenwriter; wrote Marty, Hospital and Altered States
Carl Dreher 1917 – sound engineer, nominated for Sound Recording Academy Awards for the films The Gay Divorcee and I Dream Too Much
Ira Gershwin 1918 – lyricist, collaborator with, and brother of George Gershwin
Marv Goldberg 1964 – music historian in the field of rhythm & blues
Hazelle Goodman 1986 – stage, screen and TV actress; first African-American to hold a leading role in a Woody Allen film, Deconstructing Harry
Arthur Guiterman – humorous poet
Luis Guzmán – actor
E.Y. "Yip" Harburg 1918 – lyricist (The Wizard of Oz, Finian's Rainbow)
Judd Hirsch 1960 – actor
Alvin Hollingsworth - painter, co-organizer of African American artist contributors to 1963 March on Washington, and early comic book artist
Ernest Lehman 1937 (BS) – screenwriter (North by Northwest, The Sound of Music, Sweet Smell of Success, Who's Afraid of Virginia Woolf?)
David Margulies – actor
 Jackie Mason – comedian and actor
Sterling Morrison 1970 – musician, co-founder of The Velvet Underground
Zero Mostel 1935 – actor
Faith Ringgold 1959 – artist and children's book author and illustrator
Edward G. Robinson 1914 – actor
Richard Schiff 1983 – Emmy Award-winning actor; star of The West Wing (his character, Toby Ziegler, also attended CCNY)
Ben Shahn – artist
Gabourey Sidibe – actress
Alfred Stieglitz 1884 – photographer
Eli Wallach 1938 MA – actor

Literature and journalism 

Alan Abelson 1942 – columnist, former editor, Barron's
Morris Raphael Cohen – philosopher, lawyer, and legal scholar
Dan Daniel 1910 – Dean of American Sportswriters
Davidson Garrett 1988- American poet
Gary Gruber 1962 – best selling author, educator, physicist
Oscar Hijuelos 1975 – won the 1990 Pulitzer Prize for his novel The Mambo Kings Play Songs of Love
Jack Kroll 1937 – culture editor, Newsweek
Paul Levinson – author of The Plot to Save Socrates and The Silk Code; winner of Locus Award, 1999
Bernard Malamud 1936 (BA) – author; won 1967 Pulitzer Prize and a National Book Award for his novel The Fixer, National Book Award for The Magic Barrel; also wrote The Natural (1952)
Montrose Jonas Moses – author
Walter Mosley 1991 MA – best-selling author whose novels about private eye Easy Rawlins have received Edgar and Golden Dagger Awards
Michael Oreskes 1975 – Executive Editor of the International Herald Tribune
Mario Puzo – bestselling novelist, screenwriter, The Godfather
Selwyn Raab – investigative journalist for The New York Times 
Alexander Rosenberg 1967 – novelist and philosopher
A.M. Rosenthal 1949 – won the 1960 Pulitzer Prize for international reporting. Was Executive Editor of The New York Times
Henry Roth – novelist and author of Call It Sleep, a novel on the Jewish immigrant experience
Robert Scheer – journalist and radio host
Stephen Shepard 1961 – editor in chief, Business Week
Anatole Shub –  editor and journalist specializing in Eastern European matters
Upton Sinclair 1897 BA – author of The Jungle (1906)
Robert Sobel 1951 BSS, 1952 MA – best-selling author of business histories
Gary Weiss 1975 – investigative journalist; author of Born to Steal (2003) and Wall Street Versus America (2006)

Science and technology

Solomon Asch – psychologist, known for the Asch conformity experiments
Julius Blank – engineer, member of the "traitorous eight" who founded Silicon Valley
Marvin Chester 1952 – physicist, quantum physics emeritus professor at UCLA
Adin Falkoff – engineer, computer scientist, co-inventor of the APL language interactive system
Richard D. Gitlin 1964 – engineer, co-invention of DSL Bell Labs
George Washington Goethals 1887 – civil engineer, best known for his supervision of construction and the opening of the Panama Canal
Dan Goldin 1962 – 9th and longest-tenured administrator of NASA
Walter S. Graf – cardiologist, pioneer in creation of emergency paramedic care system
Robert E. Kahn 1960 – Internet pioneer, co-inventor of the TCP/IP protocol, co-recipient of the Turing Award in 2004
Allen Kent – pioneer of information science, especially mechanized information retrieval
Gary A. Klein 1964 – research psychologist, known for pioneering the field of naturalistic decision making
Leonard Kleinrock 1957 – Internet pioneer
Solomon Kullback – mathematician; NSA cryptology pioneer
Lewis Mumford – historian of technology
Charles Lane Poor – noted astronomer
Mario Runco, Jr. 1974 – astronaut
Jonas Salk 1934 – inventor of the Salk polio vaccine
Philip H. Sechzer 1934 – anesthesiologist, pioneer in pain management; inventor of patient-controlled analgesia
Abraham Sinkov – mathematician; NSA (National Security Agency) cryptology pioneer
David B. Steinman 1906 – engineer; bridge designer
Leonard Susskind 1962 – physicist, string theory
Victor Twersky 1943 – physicist, scattering theory – physicist and IEEE Fellow renowned for his contributions to the multiple scattering theory; professor of applied mathematics in the Department of Mathematics, Statistics and Computer Science at University of Illinois at Chicago (1966-1990)

Business

Andrew Grove 1960 – 4th employee of Intel, and eventually its president, CEO, and chairman; TIME magazine's Man of the Year in 1997; donated $26,000,000 to CCNY's Grove School of Engineering in 2006
Melvin Simon 1949 – real estate developer, co-founder of Simon Property Group

Sports

Red Holzman 1942 – basketball coach for the New York Knicks
Holcombe Rucker 1962 – organizer and namesake of the Rucker Tournament

Fictional alumni

Lennie Briscoe – character from the TV show Law & Order
Don Draper – character on the TV show Mad Men
Brian Flanagan – character from the 1988 film Cocktail
Gordon Gekko – character from the 1987 film Wall Street
Nancy – character from the 1971 film Bananas
Toby Ziegler – character from the TV show The West Wing

See also
 :Category:City College of New York alumni
 List of City College of New York people

Footnotes

References and further reading
 S. Willis Rudy, College of the City of New York 1847–1947, 1949.
 James Traub, City on a Hill: Testing the American Dream at City College, 1994.
 Paul David Pearson, The City College of New York: 150 years of academic architecture, 1997.
 Sandra S. Roff, et al., From the Free Academy to Cuny: Illustrating Public Higher Education in New York City, 1847–1997, 2000.

City College of New York